Vexillum mccauslandi is a species of small sea snail in the family Costellariidae.

References

mccauslandi
Gastropods described in 2005